Samkor Kiatmontep, also known as  Samkor Chor.Rathchatasupak (born April 4, 1975; nickname: Maew) is a Thai former Muay Thai kickboxer. He is known for his devastating left kicks.

Biography
He was the youngest of his parents' three children. As a child he was very fond of football, he likes to play football and his favorite football club is Liverpool. He was a footballer and runner who represented his school, he had ambitions to become a Thailand national football team player and had no interest in Muay Thai.

However at the age of 13, he was persuaded to become a Muay Thai fighter by his physical education teacher. His first fight was priced at 20 baht. He then moved to Chor.Rathchatasupak Gym in the city of Buriram in order to practice Muay Thai and began to use the name "Samkor Chor.Rathchatasupak".

In his heyday, he was known to have the most powerful kicks among Thai kickboxers.

Samkor competed in a total of 225 fights with 187 wins, 30 losses and 3 draws. His highest value fight was more than 200,000 baht. He retired from boxing at the age of 37 in 2012. During his retirement, he has traveled as a Muay Thai trainer in both Japan and Hong Kong.

Titles and accomplishments
Lumpinee Stadium
 1995 Lumpinee Stadium 122 lbs Champion
 1998 Lumpinee Stadium 135 lbs Champion
 2000 Lumpinee Stadium 130 lbs Champion
Professional Boxing Association of Thailand (PAT) 
 1997 Thailand 135 lbs Champion
All Japan Kickboxing Federation
 2004 AJKF Lightweight Tournament Runner-Up
Toyota Marathon
 2005 Toyota Marathon 154 lbs Tournament Winner 
World Muay Thai Council
 2011 World Muay Thai Council 154 lbs Champion

Fight record

|- style="background:#fbb;"
| 2012-03-08 || Loss || align=left| Denis Varaska || Fight Nights: Battle Of Moscow 6 || Moscow, Russia || Decision (Unanimous) || 3 || 3:00
|- style="background:#fbb;"
| 2011-11-26 || Loss ||align=left| Ruslan Kushnirenko || WKN Big 8 Tournament, Quarter Final || Minsk, Belarus || Decision  || 3 || 3:00
|- style="background:#cfc;"
| 2011-05-31 || Win || align=left| Denis Varaska || Fight Factory || Hong Kong || Decision (Unanimous) || 5 || 3:00
|-
! style=background:white colspan=9 |
|- style="background:#fbb;"
| 2009-12-12 || Loss ||align=left| Viktor Dick ||  Backstreet Fights II	 || Germany || Decision  || 3 || 3:00
|- style="background:#fbb;"
| 2009-11-21 || Loss ||align=left| Malik Mangouchi ||   The Star of Thai Boxing N°4 || Belgium || Decision  || 5 || 3:00
|- style="background:#fbb;"
| 2008-07-26 || Loss||align=left| Yutaro Yamauchi || AJKF Reverse×Rebirth|| Tokyo, Japan || Decision (Majority) || 5 || 3:00
|- style="background:#cfc;"
| 2008-06-22 || Win ||align=left| Yuya Yamamoto || AJKF Norainu Dengekisakusen|| Tokyo, Japan || Decision (Split) || 5 || 3:00
|- style="background:#cfc;"
| 2007-09-29 || Win ||align=left| Ray Staring || AJKF Road to 70's|| Tokyo, Japan || KO (Left High Kick) || 2 || 2:08
|- style="background:#fbb;"
| 2007-06-16 || Loss ||align=left| Farid Villaume || The Night of the Superfights VIII || Paris, France || TKO (Referee Stoppage) || 4 ||
|- style="background:#fbb;"
| 2007-04-07 || Loss ||align=left| Chahid Oulad El Hadj || Balans Fight Night || Tilburg, Netherlands || Decision || 5 || 3:00
|- style="background:#fbb;"
| 2006-12-02 || Loss ||align=left| Marco Piqué || Janus Fight Night 2006, Semi Finals || Padua, Italy || Decision || 3 || 3:00
|- style="background:#cfc;"
| 2006-12-02 || Win ||align=left| Rafik Bakkouri || Janus Fight Night 2006, Quarter Finals || Padua, Italy || Decision (Split) || 3 || 3:00
|- style="background:#fbb;"
| 2006-11-18 || Loss ||align=left| Morad Sari ||  France vs Thaïlande || Levallois-Perret, France || Decision || 5 || 3:00
|- style="background:#cfc;"
| 2006-08-19 || Win ||align=left| David Pacquette || Muaythai Legends - England VS Thailand ||  United Kingdom || Decision (Split) || 3 || 3:00
|- style="background:#cfc;"
| 2006-05-26 || Win ||align=left| Wilfried Montagne ||  Le grand Tournoi ||  Paris, France || KO || 1 ||
|- style="background:#fbb;"
| 2006-03-02 || Loss ||align=left| Wilfried Montagne ||  France vs Thaïlande ||  France || DQ || 1 ||
|- style="background:#c5d2ea;"
| 2006-01-06 || Draw ||align=left| Arslan Magomedov ||  The Supreme Champions Of Muay Thai ||  Hong Kong || Decision || 5 || 3:00
|- style="background:#cfc;"
| 2005-12-05 || Win ||align=left| Phil Mcalpine ||   King's Birthday ||  Bangkok, Thailand || Decision || 5 || 3:00
|- style="background:#cfc;"
| 2005-10-29 || Win ||align=left| Kazuya Masaki ||  NO KICK, NO LIFE 〜FINAL〜||  Tokyo, Japan || Decision (Split) || 5 || 3:00
|- style="background:#fbb;"
| 2005-09-06 || Loss ||align=left| Yodsanklai Fairtex || Petchyindee Fights, Lumpinee Stadium || Bangkok, Thailand || Decision (Unanimous) || 5 || 3:00
|-
! style=background:white colspan=9 |
|- style="background:#fbb;"
| 2005-06-07 || Loss ||align=left|  Jeong Eun-Cheon || KOMA || South Korea || TKO ||  ||
|- style="background:#cfc;"
| 2005- || Win||align=left| Jovan Stojanovski || Lumpinee Stadium || Bangkok, Thailand ||KO ||2  ||
|- style="background:#fbb;"
| 2004-06-18 || Loss||align=left| Tsogto Amara || AJKF All Japan Lightweight Tournament 2004 FINAL STAGE, Final||  Tokyo, Japan || Ext.R Decision (Unanimous) || 6 || 3:00 
|-
! style=background:white colspan=9 |For the AJKF All Japan Lightweight Tournament 2004 Championship.
|- style="background:#cfc;"
| 2004-06-18 || Win ||align=left| Satoruvashicoba || AJKF All Japan Lightweight Tournament 2004 FINAL STAGE, Semi Final||  Tokyo, Japan || Decision (Unanimous) || 3 || 3:00
|- style="background:#cfc;"
| 2004-01-04 || Win ||align=left| Masaaki Kato || AJKF Wilderness||  Tokyo, Japan || Decision (Split) || 5 || 3:00
|- style="background:#fbb;"
| 2003-12-09 || Loss ||align=left| Singdam Kiatmuu9 || Lumpinee Stadium || Bangkok, Thailand || Decision || 5 || 3:00
|- style="background:#fbb;"
| 2003-11-14 || Loss ||align=left| Singdam Kiatmuu9 || Lumpinee Stadium || Bangkok, Thailand || Decision || 5 || 3:00
|- style="background:#cfc;"
| 2003-07-20 || Win ||align=left| Abdoulaye M'Baye || AJKF KICK OUT ||  Tokyo, Japan || KO (Left Middle Kick) || 3 || 1:24

|- style="background:#cfc;"
| 2003 || Win ||align=left| Attachai Fairtex || Lumpinee Stadium || Bangkok, Thailand || Decision|| 5 || 3:00
|- style="background:#;"
| 2003-04-14 || ||align=left| Singdam Kiatmuu9 || Lumpinee Stadium || Bangkok, Thailand || ||  ||

|- style="background:#fbb;"
| 2003-03-28 || Loss ||align=left| Khunsuk Phetsuphan || Lumpinee Stadium || Bangkok, Thailand || Decision || 5 || 3:00

|- style="background:#cfc;"
| 2003-02-07 || Win ||align=left| Hisayuki Kanazawa || AJKF RED ZONE||  Tokyo, Japan || KO (Left Elbow) || 3 || 0:49

|- style="background:#fbb;"
|  2003-01-14 || Loss ||align=left| Nontachai Kiatwanlop|| Petchpanomrung, Lumpinee Stadium || Bangkok, Thailand || Decision || 5 || 3:00

|- style="background:#cfc;"
|  2002-11-05 || Win ||align=left| Huasai Oldweightgym || Lumpinee Stadium || Bangkok, Thailand || Decision || 5 || 3:00

|- style="background:#cfc;"
| 2002-09-06 || Win ||align=left| Satoshi Kobayashi || A.J.K.F. GOLDEN TRIGGER || Tokyo, Japan || KO (Low Kicks) || 3 || 2:10

|- style="background:#cfc;"
|  2002-07-05 || Win ||align=left| Thongthai Por.Burapha|| Lumpinee Stadium || Bangkok, Thailand || TKO (Doctor Stoppage)|| 4 ||

|- style="background:#cfc;"
|  2002-05-23 || Win ||align=left| Nongbee Kiatyongyut || Rajadamnern Stadium || Bangkok, Thailand || TKO || 5 || 
|-  style="background:#fbb"
| 2002-04-26 || Loss ||align=left| Namsaknoi Yudthagarngamtorn || Lumpinee Stadium || Bangkok, Thailand || Decision  || 5 || 3:00
|-
! style=background:white colspan=9 |
|- style="background:#cfc;"
|  2002-03-22 || Win ||align=left| Nontachai Kiatwanlop|| Lumpinee Stadium || Bangkok, Thailand || Decision || 5 || 3:00
|-
! style=background:white colspan=9 |
|- style="background:#fbb;"
| 2002 || Loss ||align=left| Attachai Fairtex || Lumpinee Stadium || Bangkok, Thailand || Decision || 5 || 3:00
|- style="background:#cfc;"
|  2001-12-07 || Win ||align=left| Nontachai Kiatwanlop|| Lumpinee Stadium || Bangkok, Thailand || Decision|| 5 ||3:00
|-
|-  style="background:#cfc"
| 2001- || Win ||align=left| Namsaknoi Yudthagarngamtorn || Lumpinee Stadium || Bangkok, Thailand ||  ||  || 
|-
|-  bgcolor="#c5d2ea"
| 2001- || NC ||align=left| Namsaknoi Yudthagarngamtorn || Lumpinee Stadium || Bangkok, Thailand ||  ||  ||
|-
|-  style="background:#cfc"
| 2001- || Win ||align=left| Namsaknoi Yudthagarngamtorn || Lumpinee Stadium || Bangkok, Thailand || Decision (Unanimous) || 5 || 3:00
|- style="background:#c5d2ea;"
| 2001-05-11 || Draw||align=left| Khunsuk Sitpramit || Fairtex, Lumpinee Stadium || Bangkok, Thailand || Decision || 5 || 3:00
|- style="background:#cfc;"
| 2001-03-27 || Win||align=left| Thewaritnoi SKV Gym || Lumpinee Stadium || Bangkok, Thailand || Decision || 5 || 3:00
|-  bgcolor=""
| 2001-01-19 || ||align=left| Namsaknoi Yudthagarngamtorn || Lumpinee Stadium || Bangkok, Thailand || ||  ||
|-  style="background:#fbb"
| 2000-12-19 || Loss ||align=left| Namsaknoi Yudthagarngamtorn || Lumpinee Stadium || Bangkok, Thailand || Decision  || 5 || 3:00
|- style="background:#cfc;"
| 2000-12-02 || Win||align=left| Attachai Por.Samranchai || Lumpinee Stadium || Bangkok, Thailand || Decision || 5 || 3:00
|- style="background:#cfc;"
| 2000-10-06 || Win ||align=left| Rambojew Don Golf Service ||Lumpinee Stadium || Bangkok, Thailand || Decision || 5 || 3:00
|- style="background:#fbb;"
| 2000- || Loss ||align=left| Saenchai Sor.Kingstar || Lumpinee Stadium || Bangkok, Thailand || Decision || 5 || 3:00
|- style="background:#cfc;"
| 2000-09-08 || Win ||align=left| Saenchai Sor.Kingstar || Lumpinee Stadium || Bangkok, Thailand || Decision || 5 || 3:00
|- style="background:#cfc;"
| 2000- || Win ||align=left| Namsaknoi Yudthagarngamtorn ||Lumpinee Stadium || Bangkok, Thailand || TKO || 4 || 
|- style="background:#cfc;"
| 2000-04-22 || Win ||align=left| Rambojiew Por.Tubtim ||Lumpinee Stadium || Bangkok, Thailand || Decision || 5 || 3:00
|-
! style=background:white colspan=9 |
|- style="background:#cfc;"
| 2000-02-29 || Win ||align=left| Lamnamoon Sor.Sumalee || Lumpinee Stadium || Bangkok, Thailand || Decision || 5||3:00

|- style="background:#cfc;"
| 2000-02-11 || Win ||align=left| Teelek Norsripueng || Lumpinee Stadium || Bangkok, Thailand || TKO (Elbows)|| 4||
|-  style="background:#c5d2ea;"
| 1999 || Draw ||align=left| Sangtiennoi Sor.Rungroj || Lumpinee Stadium || Bangkok, Thailand || Decision || 5 || 3:00
|- style="background:#fbb;"
| 1999-06-22 || Loss ||align=left| Khunsuk Sit Promeet || Lumpinee Stadium || Thailand || Decision || 5 || 3:00
|- style="background:#fbb;"
| 1999-05-11 || Loss||align=left| Kaolan Kaovichit ||  Lumpinee Stadium || Bangkok, Thailand || Decision || 5 || 3:00
|- style="background:#fbb;"
| 1999-03-26 || Loss ||align=left| Kaolan Kaovichit ||  Lumpinee Stadium || Bangkok, Thailand || Decision || 5 || 3:00
|-
! style=background:white colspan=9 |

|- style="background:#;"
| 1999-02-10 || ||align=left| Attachai Por.Yosanan ||  Lumpinee Stadium || Bangkok, Thailand || || ||
|- style="background:#cfc;"
| 1998-12-08 || Win||align=left| Attachai Por.Yosanan || Lumpinee Stadium || Bangkok, Thailand || Decision || 5 || 3:00
|- style="background:#fbb;"
| 1998-10-26 || Loss ||align=left| Attachai Por.Yosanan || Rajadamnern Stadium || Bangkok, Thailand || Decision || 5 || 3:00
|- style="background:#;"
| 1998-08-07 || ||align=left| Rambojew Por.Tubtim || Por Pramuk, Lumpinee Stadium || Bangkok, Thailand || ||  ||

|- style="background:#cfc;"
| 1998- || Win ||align=left| Sangtiennoi Sor.Rungroj || Lumpinee Stadium || Bangkok, Thailand || Decision || 5 || 3:00
|-
! style=background:white colspan=9 |

|- style="background:#cfc;"
| 1998-03-03 || Win ||align=left| Khunsuk Suniweradee || Lumpinee Stadium || Bangkok, Thailand || Decision || 5 || 3:00
|- style="background:#fbb;"
| 1997-12-19 || Loss ||align=left| Lamnamoon Sor.Sumalee || Lumpinee Stadium || Bangkok, Thailand || Decision || 5||3:00

|- style="background:#cfc;"
| 1997-10- || Win ||align=left| Rambojew Don Golf Service ||Lumpinee Stadium || Bangkok, Thailand || Decision || 5 || 3:00
|-  bgcolor="#cfc"
| 1997-09-13 || Win ||align=left| Kaolan Kaovichit || Lumpinee Stadium || Bangkok, Thailand || Decision (Unanimous) || 5 || 3:00
|-  bgcolor="#fbb"
| 1997-06-22 || Loss||align=left| Khunsuk Sit Poramed || Lumpinee Stadium || Bangkok, Thailand || Decision (Unanimous) || 5 || 3:00
|- style="background:#cfc;"
| 1997- || Win||align=left| Thongthai Por.Burapa || Lumpinee Stadium || Bangkok, Thailand || Decision || 5||3:00 
|-
! style=background:white colspan=9 |
|- style="background:#fbb;"
| 1997-02-15 || Loss ||align=left| Lamnamoon Sor.Sumalee || Lumpinee Stadium || Bangkok, Thailand || Decision || 5||3:00
|- style="background:#cfc;"
| 1997-01-05 || Win||align=left| Bagjo Sor.Phanuch ||  || Chachoengsao, Thailand || || || 
|-
! style=background:white colspan=9 |
|- style="background:#fbb;"
| 1996-11-12 || Loss||align=left| Namkabuan Nongkee Pahuyuth || Lumpinee Stadium || Bangkok, Thailand  || Decision || 5 || 3:00
|-
! style=background:white colspan=9 |
|- style="background:#fbb;"
| 1996-10-05 || Loss ||align=left| Namkabuan Nongkee Pahuyuth || Lumpinee Stadium || Bangkok, Thailand || Decision || 5 || 3:00
|- style="background:#cfc;"
| 1996-08-23 || Win ||align=left| Kaoponglek Luksuratum || Lumpinee Stadium || Bangkok, Thailand || Decision || 5||3:00
|- style="background:#fbb;"
| 1996-03-05 || Loss ||align=left| Therdkiat Sitthepitak || Lumpinee Stadium || Bangkok, Thailand || Decision || 5||3:00
|- style="background:#cfc;"
| 1995-11-28 || Win ||align=left| Jompoplek Sor Sumalee || Lumpinee Stadium || Bangkok, Thailand || Decision || 5||3:00
|- style="background:#cfc;"
| 1995 || Win ||align=left| Chernung Sit Yutapoon || Lumpinee Stadium || Bangkok, Thailand || || ||
|-
! style=background:white colspan=9 |
|- style="background:#fbb;"
| 1995-08-22 || Loss ||align=left| Namkabuan Nongkee Pahuyuth || Lumpinee Stadium || Bangkok, Thailand || Decision || 5 || 3:00

|- style="background:#fbb;"
| 1995-04-04 || Loss ||align=left| Lamnamoon Sor.Sumalee || Lumpinee Stadium || Bangkok, Thailand || Decision || 5||3:00
|- style="background:#cfc;"
| 1995-03-03 || Win ||align=left| Chatchai Paiseetong || Lumpinee Stadium || Bangkok, Thailand || Decision || 5 || 3:00

|- style="background:#cfc;"
| 1995-01-17 || Win||align=left| Mathee Jadeepitak || Fairtex, Lumpinee Stadium || Bangkok, Thailand || Decision || 5||3:00
|- style="background:#fbb;"
| 1994-12-09 || Loss||align=left| Silapathai Jockygym || Lumpinee Stadium ||  Bangkok, Thailand  || Decision || 5 || 3:00

|- style="background:#cfc;"
| 1994-11-15 || Win||align=left|  Mathee Jadeepitak  || Lumpinee Stadium || Bangkok, Thailand || Decision || 5 || 3:00
|-
! style=background:white colspan=9 |
|- style="background:#cfc;"
| 1994-10-24 || Win ||align=left| Karuhat Sor.Supawan || Rajadamnern Stadium || Bangkok, Thailand || Decision || 5 || 3:00
|- style="background:#cfc;"
| 1994-08-26 || Win ||align=left| Wangchannoi Sor Palangchai || Lumpinee Stadium || Bangkok, Thailand || Decision || 5 ||3:00
|- style="background:#cfc;"
| 1994- || Win ||align=left| Rittichai Lookchaomaesaitong || Lumpinee Stadium || Bangkok, Thailand || Decision || 5 ||
|- style="background:#fbb;"
| 1994-07-19 || Loss ||align=left| Lamnamoon Sor.Sumalee || Lumpinee Stadium || Bangkok, Thailand || Decision || 5 || 3:00
|- style="background:#cfc;"
| 1994-06-10 || Win ||align=left| Boontawarn Sithuakaew || Lumpinee Stadium || Bangkok, Thailand || Decision || 5 || 3:00
|- style="background:#fbb;"
| 1994-05-27 || Loss ||align=left| Saengmorakot Sor.Ploenchit || Lumpinee Stadium || Bangkok, Thailand || Decision || 5 || 3:00

|- style="background:#fbb;"
| 1994-03-04 || Loss ||align=left| Nungubon Sitlerchai || Lumpinee Stadium || Bangkok, Thailand || TKO || 3 ||
|- style="background:#cfc;"
| 1994-01-28 || Win||align=left| Nungubon Sitlerchai || Lumpinee Stadium || Bangkok, Thailand || Decision || 5||3:00
|- style="background:#cfc;"
| 1993-12-24 || Win ||align=left| Jaroensap Kiatbanchong || Lumpinee Stadium || Bangkok, Thailand || Decision || 5 || 3:00
|- style="background:#cfc;"
| 1993-12-03 || Win ||align=left| Ritthidej Keadpayak || Lumpinee Stadium || Bangkok, Thailand || Decision || 5 || 3:00
|- style="background:#cfc;"
| 1993-10-02 || Win ||align=left| Chingchai Sakdiroon || Lumpinee Stadium || Bangkok, Thailand || Decision || 5 || 3:00
|- style="background:#cfc;"
| 1993-07-13 || Win ||align=left| Prabpramlek Sitnarong|| Lumpinee Stadium || Bangkok, Thailand || Decision || 5 || 3:00
|- style="background:#cfc;"
| 1993-05-07 || Win ||align=left| Thewaritnoi Sor.Rakchat|| Lumpinee Stadium || Bangkok, Thailand || Decision || 5 || 3:00
|- style="background:#fbb;"
| 1993- || Loss||align=left| Kompayak Singmanee || Lumpinee Stadium || Bangkok, Thailand || Decision || 5 || 3:00
|- style="background:#fbb;"
| 1992-11-20 || Loss||align=left| Kompayak Singmanee || Lumpinee Stadium || Bangkok, Thailand || Decision || 5 || 3:00
|- style="background:#fbb;"
| 1992-09-25 || Loss||align=left| Nongnarong Luksamwrong || Lumpinee Stadium || Bangkok, Thailand || Decision || 5 || 3:00
|-
! style=background:white colspan=9 |
|- style="background:#fbb;"
| 1992 || Loss||align=left| Pichitnoi Sithbangrajan|| Lumpinee Stadium || Bangkok, Thailand || KO (Punches)||  ||
|-
| colspan=9 | Legend:

References

External links 
 
 
 https://www.siamfightmag.com/en/muaythai-en/interviews-muaythai-en/thai-boxers-en/725-samkor-kietmontep
 https://www.siamfightmag.com/en/muaythai-en/reports-en/others-reports-muaythai-en/1279-the-fights-of-anthology-of-golden-age-of-muay-thai-chapter-ii

1975 births
Living people
Samkor Kiatmontep
Samkor Kiatmontep
Muay Thai trainers
Thai expatriate sportspeople in Japan